The Mad Doctor is a 1941 American black-and-white crime thriller film from Paramount Pictures, produced by George M. Arthur, directed by Tim Whelan, and starring Basil Rathbone as a physician whose successive wealthy wives die. Ellen Drew plays his latest bride. John Howard plays her ex-fiancé, who grows increasingly suspicious of her new husband.

Plot
A sophisticated but murderous physician (Basil Rathbone) woos, weds, and murders several of his wealthy women patients for their fortunes. The women appear to have died prematurely, with their above-suspicion doctor husband diagnosing their deaths as coming as a result of disease. The doctor's loyal male assistant (Martin Kosleck) tampers with the victims buried bodies in order to hide the incriminating evidence. The ex-fiancé of the doctor's latest bride (Ellen Drew) is able to save her from suffering the same fate of her predecessors, while also informing the authorities of just how the women died. With the police coming for him, the doctor has no recourse but suicide, in the form of a fatal plunge from a skyscraper.

Cast
Basil Rathbone as Dr. George Sebastian / Dr. Frederick Langamann
Ellen Drew as Linda Boothe
John Howard as Gil Sawyer
Barbara Jo Allen as Louise Watkins (as Barbara Allen)
Ralph Morgan as Dr. Charles Downer
Martin Kosleck as Maurice Gretz
Kitty Kelly as Winnie
Hugh O'Connell as Lawrence Watkins

Production
The Mad Doctor was in production from January 22 until mid-March 1940, and was released February 14, 1941. Paramount Pictures credits Howard J. Green for the screenplay, but early drafts titled The Monster and Destiny were written by Ben Hecht and Charles MacArthur. Before he accepted a role in the film, Basil Rathbone required changes to the script.

Reception
The Hollywood Reporter called the film "one of the top efforts of its type", which it attributed to the "beautifully imaginative direction of Tim Whelan and the stunning performance of Basil Rathbone".

References

External links

1941 films
American crime thriller films
American black-and-white films
Films scored by Victor Young
Films directed by Tim Whelan
Paramount Pictures films
1940s crime thriller films
1940s English-language films
1940s American films